Asya is a given name with varied origins. It is a Turkish feminine given name meaning Asia. It is a Bulgarian and Russian diminutive form of the feminine given name Anastasia, meaning resurrection. It is also a form of the Arabic name Asiya, meaning thoughtful.

People
Asya of Diauehi, a ruler of the Kingdom of Diaokhi,  a confederation of proto-Georgian tribes, who reigned around the middle of the 9th century BCE.
Asya (singer) (born 1965), Turkish singer
Asya, ring name of  American bodybuilder, model and professional wrestler Christi Wolf
Asya Abdullah (born 1971), Kurdish politician, co-chairwoman of the Democratic Union Party (PYD)
Asya Alashaikh, founder and CEO of Tamkeen Company for sustainable solutions in the Kingdom of Saudi Arabia.
Asya Ramazan Antar (1998-2016), Kurdish Women's Protection Units (YPJ) fighter who has become a symbol of the feminist struggle in the Rojava conflict and in the fight against ISIS, by international media.
Asya Branch (born 1998), American beauty pageant titleholder and Miss USA 2020 winner
Asya Bussie (born 1991), American basketball player
Adi Asya Katz (born 2004), Israeli rhythmic gymnast
Asya Kolchynska (1918-2010),  Ukrainian pathophysiologist, medical doctor, professor, and Laureate of the State Prize of Ukraine in Science and Technology
Asya Miller (born 1979), American goalball player
Asya Pereltsvaig (born 1972), Russian linguist
Asya Rolls, Israeli, psychoneuroimmunologist and International Howard Hughes Medical Institute Investigator and an associate professor at the Immunology and Center of Neuroscience at Technion within the Israel Institute of Technology]]
Asya Saavedra, founding member of the music group Smoosh renamed Chaos Chaos
Asya Sultanova (1923-2021), Azerbaijani composer
Asya Yeutykh (born 1962), goldsmith and bladesmith from the Republic of Adygea in Russia

Notes

Feminine given names